Ezzedine Choukri Fishere (born 1966 in Kuwait City) is an Egyptian novelist, diplomat and academic.

Early life and career
Ezzedine was born to Egyptian parents working in Kuwait. At the age of two, he returned to Egypt with his mother and siblings while his father stayed back in Kuwait to support the family. Fishere grew up in Mansura, a quiet town by the Nile. Bright at school, he graduated from Mansoura Secondary School in Dakahlia at the age of 16 and was among the top ten students in the country (1983). In 1987, he graduated from the political science department at Cairo University, and joined Al-Ahram Centre for Political Studies. Two years later, he had completed his military service and joined the Foreign Service. In 1992, he obtained an International Diploma in Administration from École Nationale d'Administration in Paris, then a Masters in International Relations in 1995 from the University of Ottawa, and finally a PhD in political science from Université de Montréal in 1998

Fishere worked intermittently as an Egyptian diplomat. In 1989, he served in the cabinet of Boutros Boutros-Ghali, in the Egyptian embassy in Tel Aviv, Israel from 1999 to 2001, and as a counselor to the Egyptian foreign minister Ahmed Aboul Gheit from 2005 to 2007. 
He also worked as a political advisor to the United Nations Special Envoy to the Middle East during the Second Intifada (2001-2004). He then joined the UN Advance Mission to Sudan UNAMIS and contributed to establishing the first UN peacekeeping mission in that country after the signing of the Naivasha peace agreement in 2005. During his year in Sudan, Fishere served as the UN's focal point for the Darfur negotiations in Addis Ababa, Ndjamena and Abuja. Fishere also served as the political advisor to the 2004 UN fact-finding mission to Lebanon investigating the assassination of former Lebanese prime minister Rafik Hariri.

In 2007, Fishere left the diplomatic service and started teaching political science at the American University in Cairo He also wrote frequently for the press, both in Arabic and in English.

When Egyptians took to Tahrir Square en masse in 2011, Fishere joined the revolutionary wave and became one of its most recognisable faces as an analyst, political adviser to key presidential candidates and a widely-read columnist.

In 2011, the first Transitional Government asked him to lead the "Supreme Council for Culture" with a view to restructuring it. While he has never joined a political party, he has provided political advice since January 2011 to Egyptian democratic political groups and presidential candidates.

Between 2011 and 2013, the Secretary-General of the League of Arab States, Nabil El-Araby, asked him to coordinate an ‘Independent Panel on Restructuring the Arab League’, chaired by Lakhdar Brahimi, and to write its report.

Fishere supported the removal of Muslim Brothers from power in June 2013, claiming that they have used democratic means to establish a religious authoritarian rule, and hoped that the new transitional period (which followed the removal of the Muslim Brothers from power) would lead Egypt along the way of democratic transformation. He accepted to serve as an independent member (and chair) of a short-lived government committee to monitor democratic transition (September – November 2013). But when that government issued a controversial protest law restricting freedom of expression, he publicly denounced it. Fishere continued to denounce authoritarianism in his writings but withdrew from active public life since the election of General Abdul Fattah Al-Sisi as president in May 2014.

In September 2016, he moved to the United States where he teaches Middle East politics at Dartmouth College. He continues to write fiction and political opinion pieces, notably in the Washington Post.

Novels

Fishere's first novel, The Killing of Fakhredine (مقتل فخرالدين) was published without fanfare in 1995 and remained unnoticed until 2009 when, together with the rest of Fishere's literary work, it drew the attention of the public and critics alike. The novel narrates the quasi-mythical life of Fakhredine, who disappeared mysteriously in a Cairo slum in the early 1990s. After an official investigation fails to substantiate rumours that he was assassinated by security forces, the chief investigator decides to pursue the matter privately. Mixing the past and present, reality with mythical and prophetical accounts, we are drawn into a world of disturbing and conflicting testimonies about the life, and earlier ‘deaths’ of Fakhredine. The novel has been reprinted several times since 2009.

Pharaonic Journeys (أسفار الفراعين) was published in 1999. Interweaving the stories of nine characters trapped in an endless journey inside and outside Egypt, this novel narrates their attempts to deal with an imaginary apocalyptic Egypt that is stricken by environmental disasters, epidemics, social decay and abject poverty – all exacerbated by the repression of a failed state. Pharaonic Journeys, though apparently a hymn to the loss of hope, is not a nihilistic verdict but an anatomy of the tragedy of a people that struggles to retain a measure of humanity - and even hope – in the midst of overwhelming decay. Like its predecessor, Pharaonic Journeys has been reprinted several times since 2009.

He published his third novel, Intensive Care Unit (غرفة العناية المركزة) in 2008, which gained him considerable praise from the public and critics alike. The novel is polyphonic, composed of four narratives by its main characters: a woman and three men. Coming from different social and religious backgrounds, the four find themselves trapped under the rubble of the Egyptian Consulate in Khartoum, which has been blown up by jihadis. Waiting for a rescue that doesn't seem to come, each of them gives free rein to a trail of introspection and reflection on their personal lives and pivotal decisions taken, as well as on the socio-political situation that led them to where they are. Intensive Care Unit immediately became a best-seller, was nominated for the Arabic Booker Prize and has been reprinted several times.

His following novel The Egyptian Assassin (ا بوعمر المصري) is a journey into the ‘heart of darkness’; it tells the story of a man who flees injustice in his country hoping to return one day and reverse it. His journey takes him from the backstreets of Cairo to the Muslim suburbs of Paris, to the jihadi world in Sudan and Afghanistan, and back to Egypt. Abu Omar's stories combine love with the brutality of state repression and jihad. It's a novel about the futility of violence and the illusion of grand narratives.

Salah Fadl, a leading Egyptian critic, declared that "with these four novels, Fishere has entered the canon of Arabic literature."

The Egyptian Assassin - (ا بوعمر المصري - together with The Killing of Fakhredine were turned into an Arabic TV series in 2018.

Fishere's fifth novel, Embrace on Brooklyn Bridge (عناق عند جسر بروكلين), was published in 2011 and shortlisted for Arabic Booker Prize (2012). It is described by critics as a novel about identity complexity that goes beyond the classic East/West dichotomy. The novel, which has been reprinted eleven times to date, narrates the stories of eight Egyptians living on the eastern coast of the United States and critically examines their struggles, claims, and illusions.

Embrace on Brooklyn Bridge was translated to English and published by American University in Cairo Press. Reviewing it, Michelle Ann Schingler wrote: "Fishere’s novel is Mrs. Dalloway for an age when conversations about immigration, particularly from Arab nations, dominate—a gripping portrait of the tenuous spaces that marginalized populations are made to occupy, and a searing examination of the struggle to belong". It received a wide range of praise by critics and general public alike.

Its Italian translation also received acclaim by Italian literary critics.

Fishere's following novel, The Exit (باب الخروج), tells the story of Egypt's revolution. Through the eyes of a father who, in 2020, writes a long letter to his son explaining his decision to "betray" his country to Israel, we live the sorrows and hopes of Egyptian who took to the streets in January 2011 and watch their struggles during the following tumultuous nine years. Since it first appeared, in serial form in the daily Tahrir newspaper, it has been a great literary and commercial success. Furthermore, when subsequent political events in Egypt followed the projected narrative of the novel, The Exit became in the public imagination a "prophecy of the Egyptian revolution".

His seventh novel, All That Nonsense (كل هذا الهراء) is about the new Egypt that is struggling to come out of the old. Under a thick layer of a repressive patriarchal society, a new generation with a new culture is looking for ways out. Evoking Arabian Nights, the novel nests stories within stories, where a male Scheherazade, Omar, tells Amal, his Egyptian-American one-and-half-night-stand lover who is about to be deported, the stories that happened to his friends during her one-year imprisonment. Interrupted only by sex, food and short naps, the storytelling examines Egypt’s multilayered conflicts, and the intertwinement of the hope and despair of its youth.

Critics have often described Fishere's literary work as "a critique of Arab society and its tragic flaws, from social decay to terrorism, and at the same time immanently universal as it addresses the fundamental questions of the human condition". Salah Fadl, a leading literary critic in Egypt, declared in a recent review that "EzzedineChoukri has confidently entered the canon of Arabic literature".
 1995: Maktal Fakhreddine, ("The Killing of Fakhredine")
 1999: Asfar Al-Fara'een, ("Pharanoic Journeys")
 2008: Ghorfet Al-Enaya Al-Murakazza, ("Intensive Care Unit")
 2010: Abu Omar Al-Masry,
 2011: E'nak E'nda Jesr Brooklyn, ("Embrace by Brooklyn Bridge")
 2012: Bab Al-Khorouj, ("Exit")
2017: All That Nonsense (Arabic: كل هذا الهرا ء)

References

External links
 Ezzedine Choukri Fishere's Facebook page
  Ezzedine C. Fishere's official Youtube Channel

1966 births
Egyptian novelists
Cairo University alumni
École nationale d'administration alumni
Ottawa University alumni
Université de Montréal alumni
Academic staff of The American University in Cairo
Living people
People from Dakahlia Governorate